Nakul Nayak is  an Indian politician. He was elected to the Lok Sabha, the lower house of the Parliament of India as a member of the Janata Dal.

References

External links
Official biographical sketch in Parliament of India website

1963 births
Living people
Lok Sabha members from Odisha
Janata Dal politicians
Biju Janata Dal politicians
Bahujan Samaj Party politicians